Furth bei Landshut is a municipality in the district of Landshut in Bavaria in Germany.

Partner community 
  Krupski Młyn, Poland

Educational Institutions
 Maristen-Gymnasium Furth (high school)
 Volksschule Furth (elementary school)

References

Landshut (district)